The Chialvo map is a two-dimensional map  proposed by Dante R. Chialvo in 1995 to describe the generic dynamics of excitable systems. The model is inspired by Kunihiko Kaneko's Coupled map lattice  (CML) numerical approach which considers time and space as discrete variables but state as a continuous one. Later on Rulkov popularized a similar approach. By using only three parameters the model is able to efficiently mimic generic neuronal dynamics in computational simulations, as single elements or as parts of inter-connected networks.

The model 
The model is an iterative map where at each time step, the behavior of one neuron is updated as the following equations:

The model has a rich dynamics, presenting from oscillatory  to chaotic behavior, as well as non trivial  responses to small stochastic fluctuations.

Analysis

Bursting and chaos 
The map is able to capture the aperiodic solutions and the bursting behavior which are remarkable in the context of neural systems.

Fixed points 
Therefore, the dynamics of the activation variable is basically described by the iteration of the following equations

Examples

Example 1 
A practical implementation is the combination of  neurons over a lattice, for that, it can be defined  as a coupling constant for combining the neurons. For neurons in a single row, we can define the evolution of action potential on time by the diffusion of the local temperature  in:

If we introduce a stimulus over cell 1, it induces two propagated waves circulating in opposite directions that eventually collapse and die in the middle of the ring.

Example 2 
Analogous to the previous example, it’s possible create a set of coupling neurons over a 2-D lattice, in this case the evolution of action potentials is given by:

With this example spiral waves can be represented for specific values of parameters.

The map can also present chaotic dynamics for certain parameter values.

The map can be used to simulated  an nonquenched disordered lattice (as in Ref ), where each map connects with four nearest neighbors on a square lattice, and in addition each map has a probability  of connecting to another one randomly chosen, multiple coexisting circular excitation waves will emerge at the beginning of the simulation until spirals takes over.

Chaotic and periodic behavior for a neuron 

References 

Chaotic maps
Neuroscience